Basheerabad is a village in Vikarabad district of the Indian state of Telangana. It is located in Basheerabad mandal of Tandur revenue division.

Geography 
It has an average elevation of 431 meters (1417 feet). The neighbor mandals of Basheerabad are Tandur and Yalal. It is 130 km away from the Hyderabad, capital city of Telangana.

References

Mandal headquarters in Vikarabad district